North Down was a constituency of the Parliament of Northern Ireland.

Boundaries
North Down was a county constituency comprising part of northern County Down, immediately south east of Belfast.  It was created when the House of Commons (Method of Voting and Redistribution of Seats) Act (Northern Ireland) 1929 introduced first-past-the-post elections throughout Northern Ireland.  North Down was created by the division of Down into eight new constituencies. The constituency survived unchanged until 1969, when it gained part of Mid Down, but the eastern half of the seat was split away to form Bangor.  It returned one Member of Parliament until the Parliament of Northern Ireland was temporarily suspended in 1972, and then formally abolished in 1973.

The original seat was centred on the town of Bangor and urban district of Holywood, and it also  included parts of the rural districts of Castlereagh and Newtownards.

Politics 
The seat had a substantial unionist majority and was always won by unionist candidates, all but one representing the Ulster Unionist Party.  It was sometimes contested by Northern Ireland Labour Party, Ulster Liberal Party and independent Unionist candidates, with only the independent Unionist receiving more than one third of the votes cast.

Members of Parliament

Election results 

At the 1929, 1933 and 1938 Northern Ireland general elections, James Craig, 1st Viscount Craigavon was elected unopposed.

At the 1945 Northern Ireland general election, Thomas Bailie was elected unopposed.

At the 1958 Northern Ireland general election, Robert Samuel Nixon was elected unopposed.

References

Historic constituencies in County Down
Northern Ireland Parliament constituencies established in 1929
Constituencies of the Northern Ireland Parliament
Northern Ireland Parliament constituencies disestablished in 1973